The Electoral district of Wembley was a Legislative Assembly electorate in the state of Western Australia. The district was named for the inner western Perth suburb of Wembley, which fell within  its borders.

Wembley was largely created out of the abolished Leederville and metropolitan sections of Wembley Beaches by a redistribution prior to the 1962 election, and was held by the Liberal Party for its entire duration. The seat was abolished ahead of the 1974 election, and the last member for Wembley, Ray Young, contested and won the seat of Scarborough.

Members for Wembley

Election results

See also
 Wembley, Western Australia
 Electoral district of Wembley Beaches

References

Former electoral districts of Western Australia